The Czechoslovak women's football championships was a competition in Czechoslovakia in women's football. The competition was organized divided between the two Czechoslovakia nations (Czech Republic and Slovakia) until 1988, the inter-national finals were played in the following years with the Czech teams winning all five of them.

History 

The first known Czechoslovak women's football teams were founded in Brno in the 1930s. Sparta Praha and Slavia Praha formed teams in the 1960s. The first international competition in Czechoslovakia was organized in 1966 titled O srdce Mladého světa (Of the Mladý svět heart). The national championships were organized in Slovakia in 1967 and in 1969 in the Czech Republic. The Czechoslovak finals were introduced in the 1988/89 season.

List of champions

1988/89 to 1992/93

References 

Defunct top level women's association football leagues in Europe
Championships
1967 establishments in Czechoslovakia
Women